Career Point University (CPU) is a private university located near Bhoranj in Hamirpur district, Himachal Pradesh, India. The university was established in 2012 by the Gopi Bai Foundation Trust through the Career Point University (Establishment & Regulation) Act, 2012. Gopi Bai Foundation Trust has also set up Career Point University, Kota in Rajasthan. Both universities are backed by the Career Point group.

Approval
Like all universities in India, Career Point University, Hamirpur is recognised by the University Grants Commission (UGC), which has also sent an expert committee and accepted compliance of observation/deficiencies. The School of Legal Studies and Governance is approved by the  Bar Council of India (BCI). The School of Pharmacy is approved by the Pharmacy Council of India (PCI). The university is also a member of the Association of Indian Universities (AIU).

References

External links

Education in Hamirpur district, Himachal Pradesh
Universities in Himachal Pradesh
Educational institutions established in 2012
2012 establishments in Himachal Pradesh
Private universities in India